George Henry Robert Charles William Vane-Tempest, 5th Marquess of Londonderry, KP (26 April 1821 – 6 November 1884), styled Viscount Seaham between 1823 and 1854 and known as The Earl Vane between 1854 and 1872, was a British aristocrat, businessman, diplomat and Conservative politician.

Background and education
Born George Vane, he was the second son of Charles Vane, 1st Baron Stewart, but his eldest son by his second wife, the former Frances Vane-Tempest, daughter and heiress of Sir Henry Vane-Tempest, 2nd Baronet. His father, born Charles Stewart, was the second surviving son of Robert Stewart, 1st Marquess of Londonderry, and had changed his surname in 1819 on marrying his second wife. The eldest surviving son of the 1st Marquess, and therefore George Vane's uncle, was the statesman Robert Stewart, Viscount Castlereagh, who had succeeded as 2nd Marquess only 20 days before George's birth.

The 2nd Marquess died the next year, and George's father succeeded as 3rd Marquess; George thereby became Lord George Vane. His half-brother (by his father's first wife, and therefore not affected by the surname change), Frederick Stewart, became Viscount Castlereagh by courtesy; he later succeeded as 4th Marquess.

In 1823, the 3rd Marquess was created Earl Vane and Viscount Seaham, with remainder to his sons by his second wife. As the eldest of those sons, Vane became heir apparent to those peerages, and became Viscount Seaham by courtesy.

Lord Seaham was educated at Eton and Balliol College, Oxford.

Political and diplomatic career
Viscount Seaham entered the 1st Life Guards, purchasing a lieutenancy on 7 February 1845, and retiring on 5 May 1848. He was then appointed a Major in the part-time Montgomeryshire Yeomanry on 15 June 1848.

He was returned to parliament for Durham North in 1847, a seat he held until 1854.

That year he succeeded his father as Earl Vane and entered the House of Lords. In 1867 he was sent on a special mission as Envoy Extraordinary to Russia to Emperor Alexander II, to invest the emperor with the Order of the Garter.

When his half-brother, Frederick Stewart, 4th Marquess of Londonderry, died childless in 1872, Earl Vane inherited the marquessate and family estates. Two years later George Vane-Tempest, 5th Marquess, was appointed a Knight of the Order of St Patrick. In 1880 he became Lord-Lieutenant of County Durham, a post he held until his death four years later.

He was appointed Lieutenant-Colonel Commandant of the 2nd (Seaham) Durham Artillery Volunteer Corps on 26 March 1864. This was a part-time unit largely recruited from his family's Seaham Colliery, and his younger brother and later two of his sons also became officers in the unit. The Marquess of Londonderry was succeeded in the command in 1876 by his eldest son.

Business interests
Lord Londonderry managed his father-in-law's estates (see below), which included some of the slate quarries around Corris, Gwynedd, Wales. He was one of the original promoters of the Corris Railway, created to carry the slate from the quarries to the markets. He sat on the board of the Cambrian Railways, latterly as chairman. He owned lead mines at Van near Llanidloes and was a supporter of the Van Railway, which connected the mines to the Cambrian Railways mainline at Caersws.

Family
Lord Londonderry married Mary Cornelia Edwards, daughter of Sir John Edwards, 1st Baronet, on 3 August 1846. They set up home at Plas Machynlleth, the Edwards family seat, and had six children:
 Lady Frances Cornelia Harriet Vane-Tempest (c.1851 – 2 March 1872)
 Charles Vane-Tempest-Stewart, 6th Marquess of Londonderry (1852–1915)
 Lord Henry John Vane-Tempest (1 July 1854 – 28 January 1905)
 Lady Avarina Mary Vane-Tempest (c. 1858 – 26 June 1873)
 Lord Herbert Vane-Tempest (6 July 1862 – 26 January 1921), chairman of the Cambrian Railways, killed in the Abermule train collision
 Lady Alexandrina Louise Maud Vane-Tempest (8 November 1863 – 31 July 1945), married Wentworth Beaumont, 1st Viscount Allendale
 
Lord Londonderry died in November 1884, aged 63. He was succeeded by his eldest son, Charles.

The Dowager Marchioness of Londonderry, as she became upon her husband's death, remained in residence at Plas Machynlleth, where she entertained Princess Alexandra, Princess of Wales, in 1897. The Dowager Lady Londonderry died in September 1906.

The 6th Marquess left Machynlleth on succeeding to the marquessate, but Lord Herbert Vane-Tempest remained resident at the Plas. He also served as Chairman of the Cambrian Railways, until he was killed in the Abermule train collision. The family gave the Plas to the townspeople after the Second World War.

Lady Frances Anne Emily Vane (1822–1899), sister of the 5th Marquess, married The 7th Duke of Marlborough. She was the mother of Lord Randolph Churchill and grandmother of Winston Churchill. On Lord Herbert's death without issue, a trust set up by his grandmother Frances Anne passed to Winston Churchill, who was his first cousin once removed. This enabled Churchill to purchase Chartwell.

Ancestry

References

External links 
 
 CricketArchive: Viscount Seaham

1821 births
1884 deaths
Lord-Lieutenants of Durham
Seaham, George Vane-Tempest, Viscount
Ambassadors of the United Kingdom to Russia
Knights of St Patrick
Seaham, George Vane-Tempest, Viscount
Seaham, George Vane-Tempest, Viscount
Londonderry, M5
English cricketers
Marylebone Cricket Club cricketers
Conservative Party (UK) MPs for English constituencies
Alumni of Balliol College, Oxford
George
English cricketers of 1826 to 1863
Presidents of the Marylebone Cricket Club
British Life Guards officers
Montgomeryshire Yeomanry officers
Corris Railway
5
People educated at Eton College